Borzysław-Kolonia  is a settlement in the administrative district of Gmina Tychowo, within Białogard County, West Pomeranian Voivodeship, in north-western Poland.

References

Villages in Białogard County